Margaret Lamwaka Odwar (née Margaret Lamwaka), also Margaret Odwar, (born 23 December 1969), is a Ugandan politician who serves as the incumbent Member of Parliament representing the Kitgum District Women's Constituency in the 10th Ugandan Parliament (2016 to 2021).

Background and education
She was born in Kitgum District, in the Acholi sub-region, in the Northern Region of Uganda, on 23 December 1969. She obtained her Primary Leaving Certificate from Koch Goma Central Primary School. In 1986, she obtained her O-Level certificate from Wanyange Girls' Secondary School, in Jinja District.

She went on to obtain a Grade III Teachers Certificate, from Alero Primary Teachers College and a Diploma in Primary Education, from National Teachers College, Unyama.

In 2006, she was awarded a Bachelor of Education degree, followed three years later by a Master of Education Planning and Administration degree, both from Uganda Christian University, in Mukono.

Career before politics
From 1989 until 2015, Margaret Lamwaka taught in primary schools in various parts of Uganda. Se started out as a Grade III Teacher at Gulu Public Primary School, in 1989, rising to Grade I Head Teacher at Pandwong Primary School, in 2015.

Political career
In 2016, Margaret Lamwaka contested for the Kitgum District Woman Member of Parliament, on the ruling National Resistance Movement political party ticket. She won and is the incumbent MP for Kitgum District Women.

In the 10th parliament, she is a member of two parliamentary committees; (a) the Committee on rules, privileges and discipline and (b) the Committee on education and sports.

See also
 Beatrice Atim Anywar
 Okello Oryem

References

1969 births
Living people
Acholi people
People from Kitgum District
People from Northern Region, Uganda
Members of the Parliament of Uganda
21st-century Ugandan women politicians
21st-century Ugandan politicians
National Resistance Movement politicians
Uganda Christian University alumni
Women members of the Parliament of Uganda